is a word or phrase associated with a particular season, used in traditional forms of Japanese poetry. Kigo are used in the collaborative linked-verse forms renga and renku, as well as in haiku, to indicate the season referred to in the stanza. They are valuable in providing economy of expression.

History
Although the term kigo was coined as late as 1908, representation of, and reference to, the seasons has long been important in Japanese culture and poetry. The earliest anthology of Japanese poetry, the mid-8th century , contained several sections devoted to the seasons. By the time of the first imperial Japanese anthology, the  a century and a half later (AD 905), the seasonal sections had become a much larger part of the anthology. Both of these anthologies had sections for other categories such as love poems and miscellaneous poems.

The writing of the linked-verse form renga dates to the middle of the Heian period (roughly AD 1000) and developed through the medieval era. By the 13th century there were very set rules for the writing of renga, and its formal structure specified that about half of the stanzas should include a reference to a specific season, depending upon their place in the poem.

A lighter form of renga called  ("playful" linked verse) was introduced near the end of the 15th century. Haikai was the linked verse practice followed and elevated by Matsuo Bashō and others until the Meiji period (1867–1912). In the Taishō period (1912–1925) a movement began to drop the kigo entirely. Today most Japanese haiku include a kigo, though many haiku written in languages other than Japanese omit it (see for example Haiku in English).

Seasons

The association of kigo with a particular season may be obvious, though sometimes it is more subtle. Pumpkins are a winter squash associated with the autumn harvest.

It may be less obvious why the moon is an autumn kigo, since it is visible year round. In autumn the days become shorter and the nights longer, yet they are still warm enough to stay outside, so one is more likely to notice the moon. Often, the night sky will be free of clouds in autumn, with the moon visible. The full moon can help farmers work after the sun goes down to harvest their crops (a harvest moon).

Japanese seasons
In the Japanese calendar, seasons traditionally followed the lunisolar calendar with the solstices and equinoxes at the middle of a season. The traditional Japanese seasons are:
Spring: 4 February–5 May
Summer: 6 May–7 August
Autumn: 8 August–6 November
Winter: 7 November–3 February

In categorizing kigo, each season is divided into early, middle, and late periods, as follows:

Early spring: 4 February–5 March
Mid-spring: 6 March–4 April
Late spring: 5 April–5 May
Early summer: 6 May–5 June
Mid-summer: 6 June–6 July
Late summer: 7 July–7 August
Early autumn: 8 August–7 September
Mid-autumn: 8 September–7 October
Late autumn: 8 October–6 November
Early winter: 7 November–6 December
Mid-winter: 7 December–4 January
Late winter: 5 January–3 February

Saijiki

An entry in a   usually includes a description of the kigo itself, together with a list of similar or related words, and some examples of haiku that include that kigo. The  are divided into the four seasons (and modern  usually include a section for the New Year and another for seasonless words). Those sections are divided into a standard set of categories, and then the kigo are sorted within their proper category. The most common categories (with some examples of Japanese summer kigo) are:

Summer

 The Season: midsummer, dog days
 The Sky and Heavens: drought, rainbow, the Pleiades at dawn
 The Earth: waterfall, flood, summer field (i.e. the abundance of summer wildflowers)
 Humanity: midday nap, sushi, sunbathing, nudity, swimming pool
 Observances: Boys' Day (May 5), A-Bomb Anniversary (August 6)
 Animals: jellyfish, mosquito, snake, cuckoo
 Plants: lotus flower, orange blossoms, lily, sunflower

Although haiku are often thought of as poems about nature, two of the seven categories are primarily about human activities (Humanity and Observances).

Common kigo in Japanese haiku

Japan is long from north to south, so the seasonal features vary from place to place. The sense of season in kigo is based on the region of Kyoto. Primarily because the classical literature of Japan developed mainly in this area. Specifically writings prior to, and including, the first part of the Edo period (the early 17th century).

[Note: An asterisk (*) after the Japanese name for the kigo denotes an external link to a saijiki entry for that specific kigo which includes a sample haiku from the Japanese haiku: a topical dictionary website.]

Spring
 Spring: the name of season is a kigo or season word. Other combinations are spring begins, signs of spring, sea in the spring, spring is gone. Higan of spring (literary beyond the border of this world), a week around the time of the spring equinox is a period set aside for Buddhists to soothe their ancestors' souls and for visiting graves. This recurs during the Higan of autumn.
 February ( or ), March ( or ) and April ( or ). The fourth month in the Japanese calendar is equivalent roughly to April in the Gregorian calendar. Therefore, the end of March is equivalent to the end of spring.
 Warm ( or ): all spring. As the weather changes from the cold of winter, any warming is noticed. Water also becomes warm.
 Spring mist or spring haze: all spring. The daytime haze of spring. The nighttime haze during spring that can obscure the moon is called oboro. Haruichiban, the first strong southerly wind of spring, is used as a kigo in modern haiku.
  blossom: early spring
  (Japanese bush warbler (sometimes translated as Japanese nightingale), Cettia diphone): early spring. The bird is used as an example of sweet sounds. Uguisu were mentioned in the preface to the Kokinshū. It is often associated with ume blossoms and new growth in early Japanese waka and is regarded as a harbinger of spring (literary "bird that announces the arrival of spring").
 cherry blossoms and cherry blossom–viewing: late spring (April). For the Japanese, cherry blossoms are such a common topic that in just mentioning blossoms in haiku it is assumed they are cherry blossoms. Blossom-viewing is an occasion for partying with friends or coworkers.
  (Blossom Festival), Buddhist festival celebrating the birth of Buddha, on 8 April.
 Frogs: all spring (February–April). Noted for their loud singing
 Skylarks: all spring. Noted for their songs in flight, swallows mid-spring, twittering: all spring. The chirping of songbirds

Summer

 Summer; other combinations are: summer has come, end of summer. Summer holidays means mainly the school holiday.
 May ( or ), June ( or ), July (or )
 Hot, hotness and hot day; also, anything related to the heat, including sweat and in contemporary haiku, air conditioning
 Wisteria, hana tachibana (wild orange blossoms) and iris: early summer (May), lotus ( or ): mid and late summer.
 Rainy season: the Japanese rainy season, usually starting in mid June.
 Hototogisu (Little cuckoo: C. poliocephalis)—all summer (May–July)—the hototogisu is a bird of the cuckoo family noted for its song
 Cicada: late summer (July)—known for their cries
 Tango no sekku is a traditional festival for boys on May 5. Matsuri is applied to summer festivals. Traditionally it meant the festival of Kamo Shrine in Kyoto.

Autumn

 fall; other combinations are: autumn has come, autumn is ending, autumn is gone.
 August ( or ), September ( or ) and October ( or ). The ninth month in the Japanese calendar is equivalent roughly to October in the Gregorian calendar. Therefore, the end of September is equivalent to end of autumn.
 Typhoon ( or )
 Milky Way (literally, "river in the heaven"), because in the autumn it is most visible in Japan.
 Moon: all autumn (August–October), and moon-viewing mid-autumn (September): the word "moon" by itself is assumed to be a full moon in autumn. (Moon-viewing and leaf-viewing in autumn (along with snow-viewing in winter and cherry blossom-viewing ( or ) in spring) are common group activities in Japan.)
 Insects implies singing insects. Also crickets: all autumn (August–October)—noted for the singing of the males
 Nashi pear, Chaenomeles, peach, persimmon, apples and grapes are examples of fruit that are used as autumn kigo.
 Colored leaves: late autumn (October)—a very common topic for haiku along with related topics such as the first colored leaves mid-autumn, shining leaves late autumn, leaves turning color mid-autumn, and  leaves start to fall late autumn. Leaf-viewing is a common group activity.
 Scarecrow, rice cropping: rice harvest and related activities are significant in Japanese life.
 Autumn Festival: autumn festival is mainly a thanksgiving for the harvest. Other feasts in the autumn, including Tanabata (the festival of the weaver maiden and the herdsman in the Heavenly Court), Grave-Visiting, and Bon Festival (ancestors' spirits come home to share the ceremonial and festival time with descendent family)—all early autumn (August)—are kigo as well as associated ornaments and activities like small bonfires called mukae-bi (welcome-fire for ancestors' spirits) and folk dancing.

Winter

 Winter, using "winter" in a haiku adds a sense of chilliness (literally and figuratively), bleakness, and seclusion to the poem.
 November ( or ), December ( or ) and January ( or )
 Cold and Coldness.
 Fallen leaves and dry leaves: all winter (November–January)—just as colored leaves are a clear sign of autumn, fallen leaves are a sign of winter.
 Snow-viewing: late winter (January)—a popular group activity in Japan. Also first snow mid winter, snow late winter, and ice late winter.
 Fugu soup, anglerfish or sea-devil stew, oyster: seasonal dishes.
 Christmas: this is a modern kigo. It was not used in the Edo period, when Christianity was forbidden.
 Calendar vendor: preparation for the new year.
 Kan, days from 5 or 6 January until 4 or 5 February (literally coldness): derived originally from the Chinese 24 seasonal periods. Also  ("great coldness"), a day around 20 January, or Beginning of Kan season (5 or 6 January).

New year

This group of kigo is a modern invention. Before Japan began using the Gregorian calendar in 1873, the Japanese New Year was at the beginning of spring.

  *  As in many other cultures, the Japanese New Year is an important time of year for celebrations and there are many activities associated with it that may be mentioned in haiku, including some "firsts": first sun, first laughter, and first calligraphy. There is also New Year's Day.
 First sparrow * —the first sparrow helps welcome the New Year.
 New Year's Day customs:  *  (a traditional decoration usually made of pine and bamboo that is place on the gate or outer doorway),  (the custom of giving pocket money to children),  (a ritual mulled saké only drunk on New Year's Day).
  (traditional Japanese New Year's Day food):  *  (a traditional vegetable broth with mochi—sticky rice cakes. The ingredients for zōni vary greatly between regions in Japan), seven herbs and rice porridge with seven herbs, eaten in the evening of 7 January.

Dispute on attribution
Switching from the old Japanese calendar to the Gregorian calendar in 1873 brought about numerous changes in life in Japan. Even traditional events have been affected by this change. One typical example is the case of Tanabata. Traditionally the date of Tanabata is seventh day of the seventh month of the Japanese calendar. The exact equivalent in the Gregorian calendar varies from year to year, but it is usually in August. Today in many places it is celebrated on 7 July; hence there is a dispute as to how Tanabata should be treated as a kigo.

Since kigo are affiliated with seasonal events, several modern haiku poets have had to reconsider the construction of kigo and their attribution to the seasons. One of the biggest changes to the local tradition is the creation of the lunar New Year as a seasonal section for kigo.

Outside Japan

Haiku started as a form of Japanese poetry and is now written in many different languages around the world. William J. Higginson's Haiku World (1996), which is the first international , contains more than 1,000 poems, by over 600 poets from 50 countries writing in 25 languages. The writing of haiku around the world has increased with the advent of the internet, where one can even find examples of haiku written in Latin, Esperanto, and Klingon, as well as numerous examples in more common languages.

International haiku poets have adapted the idea of kigo to their local conditions and culture. Many phenomena that might be used as kigo are similar throughout much of the world, such as the blooming of flowers and trees in the spring, and the migration of birds in the spring and autumn. Even if the trees and birds are not the same as in Japan, the concepts are still the same.

On the other hand, climatic conditions can often be very different from what the Japanese are used to. The tropics, for example, are very different from the temperate climate of Japan and usually only have a wet or Monsoon season, and a dry season. Tornado Alley area of the United States has its tornado season (peaking from late winter through mid summer, depending upon latitude). Areas with a Mediterranean climate, such as Western Australia, coastal California, and Spain have their summer Fire Season. On the other hand, in the Caribbean and the east coast of North America and surrounding areas, it is Hurricane Season during the summer and autumn months.

There are many local cultures around the world, with similarities and differences. One similarity is that many areas have harvest festivals with bonfires. One difference between locations is that migrating birds will be present in different locations at different times of year.

Here are some examples of kigo from southern California:

 Heaven: Santa Ana winds (hot, dry winds that usually happen in winter), June gloom (heavy overcast that is usually found on the coast), Smog (an inversion layer over the Los Angeles basin makes the smog worse during the summer)
 The Earth: "Fire season" and Forest fires (from the very dry months of July and August through the early rains of winter there is the danger of fires in the hills and mountains)
 Humanity: Surfing, Beach volleyball, Rollerblading, and Skateboarding (although these are activities that are now done around the world, their popularity started in southern California)
 Observances: Easter sunrise services in the Hollywood Bowl, Tournament of Roses Parade (on New Year's Day morning before the Rose Bowl college football game).  (the Mexican Day of the Dead celebration on 1 and 2 November)
 Animals: Grunion (a sardine-sized fish that spawns by laying its eggs in the sand at high tide near midnight), whale watching (Pacific gray whales can be seen from the coast or on whale-watching boat trips as they go to and from their breeding lagoon in Baja California.)
 Plants: Jacaranda (an introduced ornamental tree found in many older neighborhoods that has an abundance of blue-purple flowers in mid-spring), desert wildflowers (the nearby deserts such as Joshua Tree National Park can be a carpet of wildflowers after a good rainy season)

Kigo and haiku: an example

Haiku had been traditionally written about the singing of mating frogs, but Bashō chose to focus on a very different sound.

Haiku without kigo

In the pre-Meiji era (before 1868), almost all haiku contained a kigo. For example, Japanese experts have classified only about 10 of Matsuo Bashō's (1644-1694) hokku in the miscellaneous category (out of about 1,000 hokku). As with most of the pre-Meiji poets, Bashō was primarily a renku poet (that is, he composed linked verse with other poets), so he also wrote plenty of miscellaneous and love stanzas for the interior lines of a renku. Usually about half the stanzas in a renku do not reference a season.

The Meiji era poet Masaoka Shiki (1867–1902), who recommended several major reforms to the writing of hokku and tanka, including an expansion in subject matter and vocabulary, still included kigo in his revision of hokku, which he renamed haiku. Experts have classified a few hundred of Shiki's haiku in the miscellaneous category (out of the few thousand that he wrote). His follower Takahama Kyoshi, who was the most influential haiku poet in the generation after Shiki, also emphasized kigo. In the early part of the 20th century, there were a number of Japanese poets, such as Kawahigashi Hekigoto, Ogiwara Seisensui, Noguchi Yonejiro, Taneda Santōka, Ozaki Hōsai, Nakatsuka Ippekirō, and Ban'ya Natsuishi who were less concerned about some traditions of haiku such as the inclusion of kigo. Some, like Hekigoto and Seisensui, actively opposed the insistence on kigo, but even they often included kigo in their haiku.

Most Japanese and many western haiku written today still follow tradition by including a kigo. Many haiku groups and editors of haiku publications insist that haiku include a kigo. Until a few modern saijiki added the miscellaneous category, no seasonless haiku would have been included as examples in saijiki, which are the major references for haiku poets in Japan.

There are some reformers who have made suggestions such as using the idea of keywords (which would include kigo as a subset). Keywords are words such as dawn, birthday cake, ocean wave, beggar or dog, with strong associations, but which are not necessarily associated with a particular season. Birds that do not migrate, such as pigeons or sparrows, are additional examples of non-seasonal keywords.

See also
 Culture of Japan
 Haiku in English
 List of kigo

Notes

References
Print
  、. [Title: "Introductory Saijiki", editor: "Ōno Rinka", Publisher: Kadokawa Shoten]
 Haiku World: An International Poetry Almanac by William J. Higginson, Kodansha International 1996  (An international haiku saijiki with over 1,000 haiku from poets in 50 countries covering 680 seasonal topics)
 The Haiku Seasons: Poetry of the Natural World by William J. Higginson, Kodansha International, 1996  (a companion book to Haiku World discussing the development of haiku, and the importance of the seasons and kigo to haiku)
 Kiyose (Seasonword Guide) by William J. Higginson, From Here Press, 2005 . 24 pp. (A pocket kiyose listing over 700 Japanese kigo in English, ordered by season and category)

Online
 Japanese Haiku — a Topical Dictionary at the Univ. of Virginia Japanese Text Initiative a work-in-progress based on the Nyu-mon Saijiki by the Museum of Haiku Literature in Tokyo, most translations by William J. Higginson and Lewis Cook
 Haiku in Twelve Months by Inahata Teiko, on the Kyoshi Memorial Museum website

Online lists of season words
 The Yuki Teikei Haiku Season Word List from the Yuki Teikei Haiku Society (Northern California)
 Kiyose from the Shiki Internet Haiku Salon:
  spring kigo
  summer kigo
  autumn kigo
  winter kigo
 Alaska Haiku Society Saijiki, with pictures and commentary for some kigo

 
Japanese poetry
Japanese literature
Japanese literary terminology